Nobody's Widow is a 1927 American silent comedy film directed by Donald Crisp and starring Leatrice Joy, Charles Ray and Phyllis Haver. It is an adaptation of a 1910 play of the same title by Avery Hopwood.

After discovering that her husband has been unfaithful to her, an upper-class English woman moves to America to stay with a friends and pretends to have been widowed and attracts several suitors. Things become complicated when her husband arrives and courts her using an alias.

Cast
 Leatrice Joy as Roxanna Smith  
 Charles Ray as Honorable John Clayton  
 Phyllis Haver as Betty Jackson  
 David Butler as Ned Stevens  
 Dot Farley as Roxanna's Maid  
 Fritzi Ridgeway as Mademoiselle Renée  
 Charles West as Valet

References

Bibliography
 James Fisher & Felicia Hardison Londré. The A to Z of American Theater: Modernism. Rowman & Littlefield, 2009.

External links

1927 films
1927 comedy films
Silent American comedy films
Films directed by Donald Crisp
American silent feature films
1920s English-language films
Producers Distributing Corporation films
Films set in England
American films based on plays
American black-and-white films
1920s American films